Japan participated in the 2010 Asian Games in Guangzhou, China on 12–27 November 2010.

Medal summary

Medal table

Medalists

A-B

C-G

H-R

S-Z

References

Nations at the 2010 Asian Games
2010
Asian Games